Navia caricifolia is a plant species in the genus Navia. This species is endemic to Venezuela.

References

caricifolia
Flora of Venezuela